"Better Now" is a song by American alternative rock band Collective Soul, released as the second single off their sixth studio album, Youth (2004), on January 24, 2005. It was written by singer-guitarist Ed Roland and producer Dexter Green. The coda features a saxophone solo. In concert, this is replaced with a guitar solo. The radio edit version also includes a guitar solo.

Jason Damas of PopMatters described the song as "a big, energetic pop hook set to a Cars-ish, robotic grind, and is spiked with a colorful layer of horns for color." "Better Now" failed to chart on the US Billboard Hot 100 but peaked at number 117 on the Bubbling Under Hot 100 chart.

Charts

Release history

In popular culture
 The Blue Chip Casino in Michigan City, Indiana uses the song in recent television and radio ads.
 The Kellogg Company used it in an ad for its Special K cereal, "feeling better now" in this instance being used to denote a woman's feeling healthier after going on their "Special K diet."
 For the 2008 Canadian election, Conservative prime minister Stephen Harper used the song as his intro music when he entered his party HQ for a victory speech. The song was similarly used in the 2011 Conservative federal election campaign. The song was once again featured heavily by the Conservative Party during the 2015 federal election campaign.
 The ending of the film Cursed. It is also featured on the soundtrack to the film.
 The band performed the song in the Charmed episode "Scry Hard".
 The trailer for the 2007 film Wild Hogs features the song.

References

External links
 

2004 songs
2005 singles
Collective Soul songs
Songs written by Ed Roland